is a former male Japanese international table tennis player.

He won a gold medal and bronze medal at the 1969 World Table Tennis Championships in the men's team event and men's singles respectively.

See also
 List of table tennis players
 List of World Table Tennis Championships medalists

References

Japanese male table tennis players
World Table Tennis Championships medalists